"Birds" is a song recorded by Dutch singer Anouk, released as the first single from her eighth studio album Sad Singalong Songs (2013). The song was written by Anouk Teeuwe and composed by Tore Johansson, Martin Gjerstad and Anouk Teeuwe. It is best known as the Netherlands' entry to the Eurovision Song Contest 2013 held in Malmö, Sweden. The song competed in the first semi-final on 14 May 2013 for and managed to qualify for a spot in the final on 18 May 2013, the Netherlands' first qualification in 9 years, where Anouk achieved 9th place in a field  of 39; the best result for the Netherlands since the 1999 competition.

Background 
On 17 October 2012, Dutch broadcaster TROS selected Anouk to represent the Netherlands at the Eurovision Song Contest 2013. Anouk selected "Birds" as the Dutch entry and presented it during a press conference on 11 March 2013.

In November 2011, Anouk played a portion of the song during an interview on the Dutch pop/rock radio station 3FM. The rules of the Eurovision Song Contest for 2013 indicate that a song cannot be released prior to 1 September 2012. However, a new clause added for the 2013 contest allows songs, such as in the case of "Birds", to compete if their previous airing in public would not give them an advantage over the other competing entries. The European Broadcasting Union cleared "Birds" for the competition under this new rule.

The official videoclip of the song was released on 15 May 2013, together with the clips of three other new songs of Anouk.

Track listing 
Digital download  
 "Birds" - 3:23

CD single (Universal M27611) 
 "Birds" - 3:23
 "Stardust" - 3:31

Charts

Weekly charts

Year-end charts

References

2013 singles
2013 songs
Anouk (singer) songs
Songs about birds
Eurovision songs of 2013
Eurovision songs of the Netherlands
Songs written by Anouk (singer)